A shadow board is a type of tool board for organizing a set of tools; the board defines where particular tools should be placed when they are not in use. Shadow boards have the outlines of a work station's tools marked on them, allowing operators to identify quickly which tools are in use or missing. The boards are commonly located near the work station where the tools are used. Shadow boards are often used in the manufacturing environment to improve a facility's lean six sigma capabilities.

Shadow boards reduce time spent looking for tools and also reduce losses. They improve work station safety because tools are replaced safely after use, rather than becoming potential hazards.

See also
 Knolling
 5S (methodology)
 Peg board

References

 

Tools
Industrial equipment
Containers
Ordering
Lean manufacturing